The TQ postcode area, also known as the Torquay postcode area, is a group of fourteen postcode districts in South West England, within eleven post towns. These cover much of south Devon, including Torquay, Paignton, Newton Abbot, Brixham, Ashburton,  Buckfastleigh, Dartmouth, Kingsbridge, Salcombe, South Brent, Teignmouth and Totnes.



Coverage
The approximate coverage of the postcode districts:

|-
! TQ1
| TORQUAY
| Torquay (centre), St Marychurch
| Torbay
|-
! TQ2
| TORQUAY
| Torquay (west, north)
| Torbay
|-
! TQ3
| PAIGNTON
| Paignton (north, Preston area)
| Torbay
|-
! TQ4
| PAIGNTON
| Paignton (centre), Goodrington
| Torbay
|-
! TQ5
| BRIXHAM
| Brixham
| Torbay
|-
! TQ6
| DARTMOUTH
| Dartmouth
| South Hams
|-
! TQ7
| KINGSBRIDGE
| Kingsbridge
| South Hams
|-
! TQ8
| SALCOMBE
| Salcombe
| South Hams
|-
! TQ9
| TOTNES
| Totnes, Dartington
| South Hams
|-
! TQ9
| SOUTH BRENT
| 
| non-geographic
|-
! TQ10
| SOUTH BRENT
| South Brent
| South Hams
|-
! TQ11
| BUCKFASTLEIGH
| Buckfastleigh
| Teignbridge
|-
! TQ12
| NEWTON ABBOT
| Newton Abbot, Kingsteignton
| Teignbridge
|-
! TQ13
| NEWTON ABBOT
| Ashburton, Bovey Tracey, Chudleigh, Moretonhampstead, Widecombe in the Moor
| Teignbridge
|-
! TQ14
| TEIGNMOUTH
| Teignmouth
| Teignbridge
|}

Map

See also
Postcode Address File
List of postcode areas in the United Kingdom

References

External links
Royal Mail's Postcode Address File
A quick introduction to Royal Mail's Postcode Address File (PAF)

Postcode areas covering South West England